Shadluy-e Sofla (also Romanized as Shādlūy-e Soflá; also known as Shādlū-ye Soflá) is a village in Avajiq-e Jonubi Rural District of Dashtaki District of Chaldoran County, West Azerbaijan province, Iran. At the 2006 National Census, its population was 374 in 77 households. The following census in 2011 counted 294 people in 77 households. The latest census in 2016 showed a population of 310 people in 83 households; it was the largest village in its rural district.

References 

Chaldoran County

Populated places in West Azerbaijan Province

Populated places in Chaldoran County